Northumberland West was a federal electoral district represented in the House of Commons of Canada from 1867 to 1917. It was located in the province of Ontario. It was created by the British North America Act of 1867.

The original definition of the riding is not known. In 1903, it was defined to consist of the townships of Alnwick, Haldimand and Hamilton, and the town of Cobourg.

The electoral district was abolished in 1914 when it was merged into Northumberland riding.

Electoral history

|- 
  
|Conservative
|James Cockburn
|align="right"|  acclaimed    
|}

|- 
  
|Conservative
|James Cockburn
|align="right"|acclaimed    
|}

|- 
  
|Liberal
|William Kerr   
|align="right"|1,336   
  
|Conservative
|James Cockburn
|align="right"| 1,105    
|}

|- 
  
|Liberal
|William Kerr   
|align="right"| 1,315   
 
|Unknown
|Sidney Smith
|align="right"| 1,160  
|}

|- 
  
|Conservative
|James Cockburn
|align="right"| 1,315    
  
|Liberal
|William Kerr   
|align="right"| 1,227   
|}

|- 
  
|Conservative
|GUILLET, George   
|align="right"| 1,448    
 
|Unknown
|WATERS, George 
|align="right"| 1,378   
|}

|- 
  
|Conservative
|GUILLET, George  
|align="right"| 1,298    
  
|Liberal
|KERR, Wm.  
|align="right"| 1,293   
|}

|- 
  
|Conservative
|GUILLET, George 
|align="right"|acclaimed    
|}

|- 
  
|Conservative
|GUILLET, George   
|align="right"|1,648    
  
|Liberal
|DUMBLE, J.H.  
|align="right"| 1,611   
|}

|- 
  
|Liberal
|HARGRAFT, John 
|align="right"| 1,591   
  
|Conservative
|GUILLET, George 
|align="right"| 1,554    
|}

|- 
  
|Conservative
|GUILLET, George  
|align="right"|  
  
|Liberal
|HARGRAFT, John 
|align="right"|     
|}

|- 
  
|Conservative
|GUILLET, George
|align="right"| 1,200    
  
|Liberal
|MCCOLL, John B.  
|align="right"| 1,130   
 
|Patrons of Industry
|ROSEVEAR, John C. 
|align="right"|621    
|}

|- 
  
|Liberal
|MCCOLL, John B.  
|align="right"| 1,506   
  
|Conservative
|GUILLET, George
|align="right"| 1,371    
|}

|- 
  
|Liberal
|MCCOLL, John B.  
|align="right"| 1,501   
  
|Conservative
|ARMOUR, Eric Norman  
|align="right"|1,357    
|}

|- 
  
|Liberal
|MCCOLL, John B.   
|align="right"| 1,438   
  
|Conservative
|MUNSON, Charles Arthur  
|align="right"| 1,308    
|}

|- 
  
|Conservative
|MUNSON, Charles Arthur 
|align="right"| 1,426    
  
|Liberal
|MCCOLL, John "B."  
|align="right"| 1,420   
|}

See also 

 List of Canadian federal electoral districts
 Past Canadian electoral districts

External links 

 Website of the Parliament of Canada

Former federal electoral districts of Ontario